The Paul Loicq Award is presented annually by the International Ice Hockey Federation (IIHF) to honour a person who has made "outstanding contributions to the IIHF and international ice hockey". Named after Paul Loicq, who was president of the IIHF from 1922 until 1947, it is the highest personal recognition given by the world governing body of ice hockey. The award is presented during the annual IIHF Hall of Fame induction ceremony.

Award recipients
List of recipients of the Paul Loicq Award:

See also
 Torriani Award

Notes

References

Ice hockey-related lists
Ice hockey trophies and awards
International Ice Hockey Federation